Microsphaeropsis caloplacae is a species of lichenicolous (lichen-eating) fungus in the family Didymosphaeriaceae. It is only known to occur in a single locality along the Kızılırmak River in Turkey, where it grows parasitically on the crustose lichen Caloplaca persica.

Taxonomy

The fungus was formally described as a new species in 2009 by Javier Etayo and Kenan Yazıcı. The species epithet refers to the genus of the host lichen, Caloplaca.

The authors noted that they placed this species provisionally into Microsphaeropsis "with some hesitation", as the species in this genus typically infect plant leaves.

Description

Microsphaeropsis caloplacae produces pycnidia that are entirely immersed in the host lichen's apothecial discs. They are apparent as barely visible blackish spots with a diameter between 30 and 50 μm, with an ostiole (opening). The pycnidial cavity is filled with conidia that measure 7.2–8.3 by 4–6 μm. Infections by this fungus do not seem to be highly pathogenic to the lichen, as the hymenium of the apothecia continues producing spores as normal.

Habitat and distribution

References

Pleosporales
Fungi described in 2009
Fungi of Europe
Lichenicolous fungi
Taxa named by Javier Angel Etayo Salazar